Leonard Henry (born January 5, 1978) is a former American football running back of the National Football League. He was originally drafted by the Miami Dolphins in the seventh round of the 2002 NFL Draft. He played college football at East Carolina. Henry was also a member of the Frankfurt Galaxy, New York Jets and Oakland Raiders.

References

1978 births
Living people
American football running backs
East Carolina Pirates football players
Miami Dolphins players
Frankfurt Galaxy players
New York Jets players
Oakland Raiders players
People from Clinton, North Carolina